Sir Edmund Denny, of Cheshunt (c. 1457/1461 - died 22 December 1520) was a Tudor courtier and politician. He was a Baron of the Exchequer during the reign of Henry VIII of England.

His son, Sir Anthony Denny, rose to become the most powerful member of the Privy Council during the King's last years. Edmund's children also included:
 Martha Denny and 
 Joyce Denny, wife of William Walsingham and then of Sir John Carey, and mother of Sir Francis Walsingham and Mary Walsingham, wife of Sir Walter Mildmay,
 Thomas Denny

Notes

References
 

 

1520 deaths
Barons of the Exchequer
16th-century English people
Members of the Privy Council of England
16th-century births
Edmund